Zhao Yingqi (Vietnamese: Triệu Anh Tề, ? – 115 BC) was the son of Zhao Mo and the third ruler of the kingdom of Nanyue. His rule began in 122 BC and ended with his death in 115 BC.

After the Han dynasty aided Nanyue in fending off an invasion by Minyue, Zhao Mo sent his son Yingqi to the Han court, where he joined the emperor's guard (宿衛, Sù wèi). Zhao Yingqi married a Han Chinese woman from the Jiu (樛氏) family of Handan, who gave birth to his second son, Zhao Xing. Yingqi behaved without any scruples and committed murder on several occasions. When his father died in 122 BC, he refused to visit the Han emperor to ask for his leave due to fearing that he would be arrested and punished for his behavior. Yingqi died in 115 BC and was succeeded by his second son, Zhao Xing (under the regency of his mother), rather than the eldest, Zhao Jiande.

See also
 Triệu dynasty
 Nanyue
 Zhao Mo
 Zhao Xing
 Zhao Jiande
 Panyu District
 Lü Jia (Nanyue)
 Museum of the Mausoleum of the Nanyue King
 Baiyue

Citations

Bibliography

Primary sources
Shiji, vol. 113.
 Book of Han, vol. 95.
Đại Việt sử ký toàn thư, vol.2 (Kỳ Triệu)

115 BC deaths
Vietnamese kings
People from Guangzhou
Year of birth unknown
Nanyue
2nd-century BC Chinese monarchs